Do Thi Hai Yen (born 1 October 1982) is a Vietnamese actress. She was born in Bac Ninh Province and grew up in Hanoi where she graduated from the Vietnamese Ballet School after seven years of study.

Biography
In 1999, director Tran Anh Hung invited Hai Yen, only 17 at that time, to play a role in the film The Vertical Ray of the Sun (France).

In 2000, Hai Yen appeared again in the film Song of the Stork (Singapore), by Nguyễn Phan Quang Bình (Vietnam) and Jonathan Foo (Singapore). The film received the "Best Feature Film" award at the Milan Film Festival in 2002 and was nominated for Grand Prix award at the Paris Film Festival in 2003.

In 2001, Hai Yen became a leading actress in Vietnam when she was selected in a competition attended by more than 2,000 candidates in Vietnam and overseas to play the main female character next to two world-famous actors, Sir Michael Caine and Brendan Fraser, in The Quiet American directed by Phillip Noyce. It was the first time in Vietnam's history that a Vietnamese actress was selected as the main English-speaking character in a Hollywood film.

As The Quiet American was screened in different countries around the world, Hai Yen was invited to attend many premiere screenings and film festivals, in Australia, Britain, the US, Italy, France, Spain, Germany, Yugoslavia, Japan, etc. Her name made the headlines of many popular broadcasters and newspapers such as CNN, Reuters, BBC, AP, ABC, Time, Newsweek, New York Times, New York Post, Variety or American Cinematographer. This exposure captured a lot of attention from the professional movie world. The Quiet American received the Academy Award Nomination, another ten wins and seven nominations at the BAFTA Awards, Golden Globes - USA, London Critics Circle Film Awards, National Board of Review - USA, Political Film Society - USA, San Francisco Film Critics Circle, Satellite Awards, Bangkok International Film Festival, Australian Screen Sound Guild, World Soundtrack Awards.in 2003. It was also elected as "One of the Year’s 10 Best!" films in 2003.

In 2005, Hai Yen was the leading actress in Story of Pao (Chuyện của Pao) by Ngo Quang Hai (Vietnam). Story of Pao, Hai Yen's first Vietnamese film, received the Viet Nam Cinematography Association's Golden Kite Awards for "Best Feature Film", "Best Actress", "Best Supporting Actress", "Best Director of Photography". "Special Jury Award" at the 51st Asian Pacific Film Festival. Official Selection - First Film World Competition at the 30th Montreal World Film Festival. Official Selection - A Window on Asian Cinema & Curtain Call Stars (Actress Do Thi Hai Yen as Pao) at Pusan International Film Festival in 2006. Official Selection - Maverick Narrative Competition at the 17th Cinequest Film Festival (U.S). Official Selection - ASEAN Film Competition at Bangkok International Film Festival, in 2007.

Story of Pao was presented at many other film festivals around the world and the film was also screened at Columbia University, Cornell University, Yale University, Harvard University, Dartmouth College, University of California - Berkeley, USC University, UCAL University and other colleges in the U.S. Viet Nam Official Submission to the Academy for Best Foreign Language Film (Oscar 2007). Story of Pao was also Hai Yen's first movie as a producer, taking care of the film's marketing and distribution.

In 2008, Hai Yen was the leading actress in the film Choi Voi (Adrift), (a co-production between Vietnam and France), be released at the Venice Film Festival in September, 2009. It is directed by Bui Thac Chuyen (Course de Nuit, Living in Fear), one of the most famous film directors in Vietnam and also the first Vietnamese to have won a prize at the Cannes Festival, in 2000 (Cinefondation).

Adrift was also presented at many other film festivals, such as:
Official Selection - Ozzizonti Competition and wins the International Critics Prize at the 66th Venice Film Festival 2009. 
Official Selection – Contemporary World Cinema at Toronto Film Festival, 2009. 
Official Selection – Main Competition at Bangkok Film Festival, 2009. Official Selection – Dragons and Tigers award at Vancouver Film Festival, 2009. 
Official Selection – A Window on Asian Cinema at Pusan Film Festival, 2009.

In 2010, Hai Yen recent film Canh Dong Bat Tan (Floating Lives), directed by Nguyen Phan Quang Binh (Song of the Stork). Based on Nguyen Thi Ngoc Tu's best selling short story "Boundless Rice Field", winner of the best short story prize from the Vietnam Writer's Association in 2007 and the Asean Literature Award recently. The film was premiered in the 15th Pusan International Film Festival in the New Currents category.  It been selected by the academy for the "New Voice from Vietnam" Programme was happen at the Hummer Museum in Los Angeles in November 2010. Floating Lives was also presented at many other film festivals, such as: 12th Cinemanila International Film Festival, 13th Udine Far East Film, 9th Reggio Emilia: Asian Film Festival, Vietnam International Film Festival.

The film won the Critics' Prize at the Viet Nam Cinematography Association's Golden Kite for Best Picture in 2010. 
Best Actor and Best Actress at the Vietnam International Film Festival in 2010.

Hai Yen was nominated for the "Best Actress in a Supporting Role – Drama" at Golden Satellite Award in 2002 for her role in The Quiet American.
Viet Nam Cinematography Association's Golden Kite for Best Actress in 2006 for her role in Story of Pao.

Viet Nam Film Festival - Golden Lotus for Best Actress in 2007 for her role in Story of Pao. 
Curtain Call – the summit of emerging Asian stars at Pusan International Film Festival in 2006. 
Vietnam International Film Festival – Best Actress Award for her role in Floating Lives, 2010.
Member of the International Jury for the Featured Film Competition "EurAsia" in Tallinn Black Nights Film Festival.

Member of the International Jury for the Featured Film Competition at Meridian Film Festival. 
Member of the Jury for the Featured Film Competition at Vietnam Cinematography Association's Golden Kite.

Hai Yen is also a Vietnamese ambassador and honour guest for several luxury brands such as Louis Vuitton, Motorola V8Luxury, Escada.

Filmography

Movies

Awards
Satellite Award for Best Supporting Actress - Motion Picture
Viet Nam Cinematography Association's Golden Kite for Best Actress in 2006 for her role in Story of Pao. 
Curtain Call – the summit of emerging Asian stars at Pusan International Film Festival in 2006. 
Viet Nam Film Festival - Golden Lotus for Best Actress in 2007 for her role in Story of Pao. 
Vietnam International Film Festival – Best Actress Award for her role in Floating Lives, 2010.
Member of the International Jury for the Featured film Competition "EurAsia" in Tallinn Black Nights Film Festival. 
Member of the International Jury for the Featured Film Competition at Meridian Film Festival. 
Member of the Jury for the Featured Film Competition at Vietnam Cinematography Association's Golden Kite.

References

External links
 
 Richard Corliss, "The Quiet Vietnamese", Time, 21 October 2002

1982 births
Vietnamese film actresses
Living people
People from Bắc Ninh province
20th-century Vietnamese actresses
21st-century Vietnamese actresses